The Provence Donkey, is a breed of domestic donkey from Provence, in south-eastern France. It is now distributed through much of central and south-east France, with the highest concentration in Provence and the Rhône-Alpes region. For hundreds of years the Provence donkey was used by transhumant shepherds of the area as a pack animal in the seasonal movement of flocks of sheep between their summer pastures on the high Alps of Haute-Provence and the Dauphiné and their winter grounds in Basse-Provence.

History

The earliest records of the use of donkeys by shepherds in Provence are from the fifteenth century. During the seasonal transhumance between the low ground where the sheep over-wintered and the high alpine pastures where they spent the summer months, donkeys were used as pack animals. They carried, on specially adapted pack-saddles, the equipment and supplies needed by the shepherds along the journey. The area of origin of the breed appears to coincide exactly with the area, consisting of Provence and parts of Savoie and the Ardèche, where transhumant sheep-farming was traditional.

Following the mechanisation of transport in the twentieth century, first by rail and then by road, the breed declined at an alarming rate. At the end of the 19th century, a census in the départements of Provence recorded 13,000 head; in 1956 the number had fallen to around 2000, and by 1993 no more than 330 could be identified. 

A breeders' association, the Association de l'Âne de Provence, was formed in December 1992, and worked with the Haras National, the national stud, of Uzès, in Languedoc-Roussillon, to achieve recognition of the breed. A stud-book was opened in December 1995, and in November 2002 the Provence donkey received the official recognition of the Ministère de l'agriculture, de l'alimentation, de la pêche et des affaires rurales, the French ministry of agriculture. The current population is estimated at 1500.

Description

At three years old, Provençal jacks stand  at the withers, and jennies .

The coat is dove grey, varying from pale to dark, with pinkish lights. The muzzle and surround of the eyes are pale; the forehead and ears usually have a russet tint. There is a well-marked darker dorsal stripe and shoulder-stripe; zebra-striping of the legs may be present. The limbs are solid and the hooves relatively large.

Use

Provençal donkeys are still used in transhumance by some shepherds. The Provence Donkey is suitable as a pack animal, for light driving and for riding. Its character and sure-footedness even on broken ground make it suitable for trekking.  It may be used in vegetation management, for brush clearance to reduce fire risk.

References

Donkey breeds originating in France
Donkey breeds
Provence